Jackson County Airport  is a county-owned, public-use airport located 3 nautical miles (6 km) northeast of the central business district of Gainesboro, in Jackson County, Tennessee, United States.

Facilities and aircraft 
It has one runway designated 18/36 with an asphalt surface measuring 3,500 by 75 feet (1,067 x 23 m).

For the 12-month period ending March 19, 2009, the airport had 2,437 aircraft operations, an average of 203 per month: 94% general aviation and 6% military. At that time there were six aircraft based at this airport: 66.7% single-engine, 16.7% helicopter and 16.7% ultralight.

References

External links 
Lodging with Transportation:  Within 2 miles of airport Brae Cabin and Alphasite
 Aerial photo as of 21 March 1997 from USGS The National Map
 

Airports in Tennessee
Buildings and structures in Jackson County, Tennessee
Transportation in Jackson County, Tennessee